French legislative elections to elect the 16th legislature of the French Third Republic were held on 26 April and 3 May 1936. This was the last legislature of the Third Republic and the last election before World War II. The number of candidates set a record, with 4,807 people vying for 618 seats in the Chamber of Deputies. In the Seine Department alone, there were 1,402 candidates.

The Popular Front, composed of the French Section of the Workers' International (SFIO), the Radical-Socialists, the French Section of the Communist International (SFIC), and miscellaneous leftists, won power from the broad Republican coalitions that had governed since the 6 February 1934 crisis. Léon Blum became president of the council.
Broad Republican coalitions had governed since the 6 February 1934 crisis: 
Government Gaston Doumergue II (Union Nationale, 272 days), Government Flandin I (204 days), Government Bouisson (3 days) and Government Laval IV (229 days).

For the first time, the Radical-Socialists were eclipsed on the left by the SFIO, while still keeping a considerable role in French politics.

Regional results 

The SFIC, predecessor of the Communist Party, doubled its score from 11 SFIC and 9 Union Ouvrière deputies in 1932 to 72 in 1936. The party made gains in industrialized suburbs and working-class areas of major cities. They also progressed in rural central and southwestern France (e.g., Dordogne, Lot-et-Garonne)
The Radicals lost votes to the SFIO and SFIC, but also to the right.
The SFIO declined slightly. In working-class suburbs, the party declined, but it gained votes in Brittany, to the dismay of the right.
Only 174 seats were elected in the first round, 424 were decided in a run-off. The right fared better in the second round.

Results

Popular Vote

|-
! style="background-color:#E9E9E9;text-align:left;vertical-align:top;" colspan="2"|Alliance
! style="background-color:#E9E9E9;text-align:right;" |Votes
! style="background-color:#E9E9E9;text-align:right;" |%
! style="background-color:#E9E9E9;text-align:left;vertical-align:top;" colspan="2"|Party
! style="background-color:#E9E9E9;text-align:right;" |Abbr.
! style="background-color:#E9E9E9;text-align:right;" |Votes
! style="background-color:#E9E9E9;text-align:right;" |%
|-
|style="background-color:red" rowspan="4"|  
|style="text-align:left;" rowspan="4"|Popular Front
|rowspan="4"| 5,628,321
|rowspan="4"| 57.17
|style="background-color:#E75480"|
| style="text-align:left;" | French Section of the Workers' International (Section française de l'Internationale ouvrière)
| style="text-align:right;" | SFIO
| style="text-align:right;" |1,955,306
| style="text-align:right;" |19.86
|-
|style="background-color:#FF0000"|
| style="text-align:left;" | French Communist Party (Parti communiste français)
| style="text-align:right;" |PCF
| style="text-align:right;" |1,502,404
| style="text-align:right;" |15.26
|-
|style="background-color:#FFBF00"|
| style="text-align:left;" | Republican, Radical and Radical-Socialist Party (Parti républicain, radical et radical-socialiste)
| style="text-align:right;" |PRRRS
| style="text-align:right;" |1,422,611
| style="text-align:right;" |14.45
|-
|style="background-color:#DA7B8B"|
| style="text-align:left;" | Miscellaneous Left (Divers gauche)
| style="text-align:right;" |DVG
| style="text-align:right;" |748,600
| style="text-align:right;" |7.60
|-
|style="background-color:blue" rowspan="3"|  
|style="text-align:left;" rowspan="3"|Right and Centre
|rowspan="3"| 4,202,298
|rowspan="3"| 42.68
|-
|style="background-color:#0080FF"|
| style="text-align:left;" | Democratic Alliance (Alliance démocratique), Independent Radicals (Radicaux indépendents), Popular Democrats (Démocrates populaires)
| style="text-align:right;" |AD-RI-PDP
| style="text-align:right;" |2,536,294
| style="text-align:right;" |25.76
|-
|style="background-color:#0000C8"|
| style="text-align:left;" | Republican Federation (Fédération républicaine), Independents, Conservatives
| style="text-align:right;" |FR
| style="text-align:right;" |1,666,004
| style="text-align:right;" |16.92
|-
|style="background-color:gray"|
| colspan=5 style="text-align:left;" | Other parties
| style="text-align:right;" |Div
| style="text-align:right;" |16,047
| style="text-align:right;" |0.16
|-
| style="text-align:left;" colspan=7 |Total
| style="text-align:right;" |9,846,666
| style="text-align:right;" |100
|-
| colspan=9 style="text-align:left;" |Abstention: 17.75%
|}

Parliamentary Groups

References

External links
Map of Deputies elected in 1936 according to their group in the House, including overseas (in french)

1936
1936 elections in France